Pharena is a village development committee in Rupandehi District in Lumbini Province of southern Nepal. At the time of the 1991 Nepal census, it had a population of 2817 people living in 400 individual households.

References

Populated places in Rupandehi District